The Adorant from the Geißenklösterle cave is a 35,000-to-40,000-year-old section of mammoth ivory with a depiction of a human figure, found in the Geißenklösterle cave in the Swabian Jura near Blaubeuren, Germany. 

The front face has a human figure of uncertain sex in relief, with raised arms and outstretched legs, but no hands. The posture is usually interpreted as an expression of worship, which is why in German the figure is called an "adorant", a word meaning "worshipper". It has been claimed that a belt and sword can be seen, although these are probably natural features of the ivory. On the plate's reverse are rows of small notches. The piece was found in 1979 and is now in the Landesmuseum Württemberg, Stuttgart. Traces of manganese and ochre can be found on it by microscope analysis.

See also
Lion-man
Venus figurines
Venus of Hohle Fels
Prehistoric art
List of Stone Age art

References

Literature 
 Joachim Hahn, 1980: "Eine aurignacienzeitliche Menschendarstellung aus dem Geißenklösterle bei Blaubeuren, Alb-Donau-Kreis". In: Denkmalpflege in Baden-Württemberg – Nachrichtenblatt der Landesdenkmalpflege, Vol. 9, Nr. 2 (1980), S. 56-58.
 Joachim Hahn, 1988: Die Geißenklösterle-Höhle im Achtal bei Blaubeuren, Stuttgart: Karl Theiss Verlag. 
 C.–S. Holdermann, Müller-Beck, H. and Simon, U., 2001: Eiszeitkunst im süddeutschschweizerischen Jura: Anfänge der Kunst,, Stuttgart: Karl Theiss Verlag. 
 H. Müller-Beck und G. Albrecht (Ed.), 1987: Die Anfänge der Kunst vor 30000 Jahren, Stuttgart: Theiss.

External links 
Don Hitchcock (Don's Maps): "The Adorant - The Worshipper" (with excellent pictures of the Adorant)

Prehistoric art in Germany
Art of the Upper Paleolithic
Archaeological discoveries in Germany
Archaeology of Baden-Württemberg
Ivory works of art
1979 archaeological discoveries